The following is a list of notable deaths in November 1990.

Entries for each day are listed alphabetically by surname. A typical entry lists information in the following sequence:
 Name, age, country of citizenship at birth, subsequent country of citizenship (if applicable), reason for notability, cause of death (if known), and reference.

November 1990

1
Richard Desmond, 63, American ice hockey player.
Ward Haylett, 95, American track and field coach.
Kim Hyun-sik, 32, South Korean musician, cirrhosis.
Cyprien Biyehima Kihangire, 72, Ugandan Roman Catholic prelate.
Ray Pohlman, 60, American guitarist, heart failure.
G. Malcolm Trout, 94, American dairy scientist.

2
Abasaheb Garware, 86, Indian industrialist.
Peter Hellings, 74, English marine.
Robert T. McLoskey, 83, American politician, member of the U.S. House of Representatives (1963–1965).
Eliot Porter, 88, American photographer.
William Travilla, 70, American costume designer, lung cancer.
Eszter Voit, 74, Hungarian Olympic gymnast (1936).
Donald Allen Wollheim, 76, American science fiction author.

3
Kenan Erim, 61, Turkish archaeologist.
Valerie French, 62, English actress, leukemia.
George Gale, 63, British journalist.
Manmohan Krishna, 68, Indian actor and film director.
Mary Martin, 76, American actress and singer, cancer.
Sashadhar Mukherjee, 81, Indian filmmaker.
Nikolai Rakov, 82, Soviet violinist.
Jack Russell, 85, American baseball player.
Walter H. Tyler, 81, American art director.

4
Mildred Allen, 96, American physicist.
Henry Cravatte, 79, Luxembourgish politician.
James C. Harrison, 64, American artist.
Cyrus Levinthal, 68, American molecular biologist, lung cancer.
Hicks Lokey, 86, American animator.
Carol Sobieski, 51, American screenwriter, amyloidosis.
David Stirling, 74, Scottish soldier.

5
Herbert Berghof, 81, Austrian-American actor and film director.
Humphrey Gibbs, 87, Zimbabwean colonial administrator.
Erich Heller, 79, British essayist.
Meir Kahane, 58, American-Israeli politician, shot.
Shunkichi Kikuchi, 74, Japanese photographer, leukemia.
Raymond Oliver, 81, French chef, cancer.
Bobby Scott, 53, American musician, lung cancer.
Suleiman Yudakov, 74, Soviet and Tajikistani musician.

6
Bob Armstrong, 59, Canadian ice hockey player.
Ed Gossett, 88, American politician, member of the U.S. House of Representatives (1939–1951).
Hilary Baumann Hacker, 77, American Roman Catholic prelate.
Thomas Hiley, 84, Australian politician.
Will Kuluva, 73, American actor.
Marcel Légaut, 90, French theologian and mathematician.
Rodrigo Moynihan, 80, English painter.
George Philip Ochola, 60, Kenyan trade unionist and politician.

7
Ack Ack, 24, American Thoroughbred racehorse.
Lemuel Ricketts Boulware, 95, American businessman.
Tom Clancy, 66, Irish singer (The Clancy Brothers) and actor, stomach cancer.
Lawrence Durrell, 78, British novelist, stroke.
John G. Fuller, 76, American writer, lung cancer.
Sigurd Monssen, 88, Norwegian Olympic rower (1948).
Stepan Privedentsev, 74, Soviet Russian painter, a member of the Leningrad Union of Artists.
Vito Russo, 44, American LGBT activist, AIDS.
Elmo Veron, 87, American film and television editor.
Josephine Wilson, 86, British actress.

8
Nils Reinhardt Christensen, 71, Norwegian filmmaker.
Jacqueline Pirenne, 71-72, French archaeologist, traffic collision.
Wolfgang Schmieder, 89, German musicologist.
Anya Seton, 86, American author.
Earl Torgeson, 66, American baseball player, leukemia.

9
Alfredo Armas Alfonzo, 69, Venezuelan writer, critic, editor and historian, well.
Olton van Genderen, 69, Surinamese politician.
Hugh MacLennan, 83, Canadian novelist.
Harold A. Stevens, 83, American judge.
Dora Söderberg, 90, Swedish actress.

10
Ronnie Dyson, 40, American singer and actor, heart failure.
Maura McGiveney, 51, English-American actress, cirrhosis.
Aurelio Monteagudo, 46, Cuban baseball player, traffic collision.
Bhalchandra Nilkanth Purandare, 79, Indian gynaecologist.
Tommy Sale, 80, English footballer.
Mário Schenberg, 76, Brazilian physicist and writer.
Çetin Zeybek, 58, Turkish football player.

11
Ted Albert, 53, Australian record producer, heart attack.
Greg Buckingham, 45, American swimmer, heart attack.
Attilio Demaría, 81, Argentine footballer.
Margarete Heymann, 91, German ceramicist.
Sadi Irmak, 86, Turkish politician, prime minister (1974–1975).
Lisa Kirk, 65, American singer and actress, lung cancer.
Alexis Minotis, 90, Greek actor and film director.
Yannis Ritsos, 81, Greek poet.
William Randolph Taylor, 94, American botanist.
John M. Zwach, 83, American politician, member of the U.S. House of Representatives (1967–1975).

12
Eve Arden, 82, American actress (Mildred Pierce, Our Miss Brooks, Grease), Emmy winner (1954), cardiac arrest, heart attack.
Balcomb Greene, 86, American artist and teacher.
Tetsumi Kudo, 55, Japanese Japanese painter, sculptor, and performance artist, cancer.
Randi Heide Steen, 80, Norwegian singer.
Junior Walsh, 71, American baseball player.
Dave Willock, 81, American actor, stroke.

13
Hanus Burger, 81, Czech-American screenwriter.
Don Chaffey, 73, British film director (Jason and the Argonauts, Pete's Dragon, One Million Years B.C.), heart attack.
Helen Dettweiler, 75, American golfer, cancer.
Wilfred Dunderdale, 90, British spy, possible inspiration for James Bond.
Frederick Rowland Emett, 84, English kinetic sculptor.
Joseph Lang, 79, American boxer.
Richard Lewis, 76, English singer.
Maurice Richlin, 70, American screenwriter.
Lester Williams, 70, American guitarist.

14
Margot Arce de Vázquez, 86, Puerto Rican writer, Alzheimer's disease.
Horst Feistel, 75, German-American cryptographer.
Antoinette Pépin Fitzpatrick, 82, French musician, heart attack.
Sol Kaplan, 71, American composer, lung cancer.
Otto Kuchenbecker, 83, German basketball player.
Malcolm Muggeridge, 87, English journalist and satirist.
Adolf Rudnicki, 78, Polish author and essayist.
Leonid Trauberg, 88, Soviet and Ukrainian film director and screenwriter.

15
Alydar, 15, American thoroughbred racehorse, euthanized.
Oswald Denison, 85, New Zealand rower.
Ettore Giannini, 77, Italian filmmaker.
Gideon Hausner, 75, Israeli politician.
Irving Janis, 72, American psychologist, lung cancer.
Princess Irina Pavlovna Paley, 86, French exiled Russian royal.
Jimmy Ward, 84, Canadian ice hockey player.

16
Pierre Braunberger, 85, French film producer.
Lee Castle, 75, American musician.
Jill Day, 59, English singer, cancer.
Yang Lien-sheng, 76, Chinese-American sinologist.
Northern Dancer, 29, Canadian Thoroughbred racehorse and sire.
Dmitri Skobeltsyn, 97, Soviet physicist.

17
Otto Demus, 88, Austrian art historian and Byzantinist.
Robert Hofstadter, 75, American physicist, Nobel Prize recipient (1961).
Edna Hughes, 74, English Olympic swimmer (1932, 1936).
Herbert B. Maw, 97, American politician, governor of Utah (1941–1949).

18
Murray Ashby, 59, New Zealand rower.
Wolfgang Büttner, 78, German actor and voice actor.
Fred Daly, 79, Northern Irish golfer, heart attack.
Harwell Hamilton Harris, 87, American architect.
David Lloyd Kreeger, 81, American art philanthropist.
Beatrice Shilling, 81, British aeronautical engineer.

19
Šefik Bešlagić, 82, Yugoslav cultural historian.
John Fitzpatrick, 86, American baseball player and coach.
Georgy Flyorov, 77, Soviet nuclear physicist, namesake of flerovium.
Phillip M. Landrum, 83, American politician, member of the U.S. House of Representatives (1953–1977).
Sun Li-jen, 89, Taiwanese general.
Lennart Ljung, 69, Swedish general.
Joseph C. Satterthwaite, 90, American diplomat.

20
Guglielmo Achille Cavellini, 76, Italian artist.
William Montague Cobb, 86, American physician and a physical anthropologist.
Herbert Kegel, 70, German conductor, suicide.
Bengt Odhner, 72, Swedish diplomat.

21
Vernon Ellis Cosslett, 82, British microscopist.
Dean Hart, 36, Canadian-American professional wrestler, heart attack.
Pierre Musy, 80, Swiss bobsledder and Olympic champion.
Eugene Rosenberg, 83, Czechoslovak architect.
Ralph Siewert, 66, American basketball player.

22
Joe Bowman, 80, American baseball player.
Gustav Fischer, 75, Swiss equestrian and Olympic medalist.
Jack Petersen, 79, Welsh boxer, lung cancer.
Benjamin H. Vandervoort, 73, United States Army officer.
Eberhard Zwicker, 66, German acoustics scientist.

23
Roald Dahl, 74, British author (Charlie and the Chocolate Factory, James and the Giant Peach, Matilda), myelodysplastic syndrome.
Bo Díaz, 37, Venezuelan baseball player, domestic accident.
Karl Aage Hansen, 69, Danish footballer.
Caio Prado Júnior, 83, Brazilian historian.
Sergio Matto, 60, Uruguayan basketball player.
Rock Pidjot, 83, New Caledonian politician.
Renate Rubinstein, 61, German-Dutch writer.
Nguyen Van Tam, 95, Vietnamese politician, prime minister (1952–1953).

24
Richard Acland, 83, English politician.
Bülent Arel, 71, Turkish composer, multiple myeloma.
Juan Manuel Bordeu, 56, Argentine racing driver.
Vincenzo Demetz, 79, Italian cross-country skier.
Helga Feddersen, 60, German actress, cancer.
Michel Giacometti, 61, French musicologist.
Wayne Hillman, 52, Canadian ice hockey player, cancer.
Ronald Hopkins, 93, Australian general.
Joseph Jadrejak, 72, French football player and manager.
Arnold Marquis, 69, German actor, lung cancer.
Keiji Nishitani, 90, Japanese academic.
Fred Shero, 65, Canadian ice hockey player, stomach cancer.
Dodie Smith, 94, English novelist (The Hundred and One Dalmatians, I Capture the Castle).
Robb White, 81, American screenwriter.
Marion Post Wolcott, 80, American photographer, lung cancer.

25
Ernest Duncan, 74, New-Zealand-Australian-American mathematician, leukemia.
Harlan Hagen, 76, American politician, member of the U.S. House of Representatives (1953–1967).
Merab Mamardashvili, 60, Soviet philosopher.
Mikko Niskanen, 61, Finnish filmmaker, cancer.
Salvatore Todisco, 29, Italian boxer, traffic collision.
Billy Vukovich III, 27, American racing driver, racing collision.

26
Frank Brisko, 90, American racing driver.
Antonín Kalina, 88, Czechoslovak humanitarian.
Savitri Khanolkar, 77, Swiss-Indian designer (Param Vir Chakra).
Samuel Noah Kramer, 93, Russian-American Assyriologist, throat cancer.
Heikki Partanen, 48, Finnish filmmaker, suicide.
Edward Pearce, Baron Pearce, 89, British judge.
Ludwig von Moos, 80, Swiss politician.
Jacques Wild, 85, French footballer.
Dave Wilkins, 76, Barbadian trumpeter.
Feng Youlan, 94, Chinese philosopher.

27
Proinsias Mac an Bheatha, 80, Irish writer.
Joseph T. Edgar, 80, American politician.
Avro Manhattan, 76, Italian writer.
Paddy Sheriff, 64, Irish basketball player and Olympian.
Ernst Oswald Johannes Westphal, 71, South African linguist.
David White, 74, American actor, heart attack.

28
Birger Bohlin, 92, Swedish palaeontologist.
Ted Catlin, 80, English footballer.
Tamara De Treaux, 31, American actress, respiratory failure.
Božena Dobešová, 76, Czechoslovak Olympic gymnast (1936).
Paco Godia, 69, Spanish racing driver.
Tommy Hughes, 71, American baseball player.
Władysław Rubin, 73, Polish Roman Catholic cardinal, Alzheimer's disease.

29
Raymond Bourgine, 65, French politician.
Harry M. Caudill, 68, American author, suicide by gunshot.
Malcolm Dole, 87, American chemist.
Günter Platzek, 60, German keyboardist, heart attack.
József Szalai, 97, Hungarian Olympic gymnast (1912).

30
Fritz Barzilauskas, 70, American football player.
Richard Brown, 83, American football player.
Norman Cousins, 75, American political journalist, heart failure.
Vladimir Dedijer, 76, Yugoslav diplomat and historian.
Fritz Eichenberg, 89, German-American artist, Parkinson's disease.
Ivan Medarić, 78, Yugoslav footballer.
T. R. Ramachandran, 73, Indian actor and comedian.
Hilde Spiel, 79, Austrian writer and journalist.

References 

1990-11
 11